Bechleja is an extinct genus of shrimp which existed during the Eocene period. It contains four species.

References

Palaemonoidea
Eocene crustaceans